Killer Lake is a lake in the Moira River and Lake Ontario drainage basins in Addington Highlands, Lennox and Addington County, Ontario, Canada.

The primary inflow is Killer Creek at the northeast, and there is a secondary unnamed creek inflow at the northwest. The primary outflow, at the southeast, is also Killer Creek, whose waters flow via the Skootamatta River and the Moira River into the Bay of Quinte on Lake Ontario at Belleville.

See also
List of lakes in Ontario

References

Lakes of Lennox and Addington County